Elizabeth Page may refer to:

Elizabeth Page (novelist) (1889–1969), American author
Elizabeth Page (screenwriter), American writer, director, and filmmaker
Molly Stark (born Elizabeth Page; 1737–1814), American Revolutionary War figure